Hilton Seattle is a hotel in Seattle, in the U.S. state of Washington. The 14-story hotel was built in 1970 and renovated in 1997 and 2014.

References

External links 

 
 Hilton Seattle at Hilton Hotels and Resorts

Downtown Seattle
Hotel buildings completed in 1970
Hotels in Seattle